USS Toxaway (SP-743) was a United States Navy patrol vessel in commission from 1917 to 1918.

Toxaway was built as a private motorboat of the same name in 1917 by the Charles L. Seabury Company and the Gas Engine & Power Company at Morris Heights in the Bronx, New York. On 9 June 1917, the U.S. Navy acquired her from her owner, J. H. Nunnally, for use as a section patrol boat during World War I. She was commissioned as USS Toxaway (SP-743) on 12 June 1917.

Assigned to the 2nd Naval District in southern New England and based at Newport, Rhode Island, Toxaway served on section patrol duties for the rest of World War I.

Toxaway was returned to Nunnally on 2 December 1918.

References

NavSource Online: Section Patrol Craft Photo Archive Toxaway (SP 743)

Patrol vessels of the United States Navy
World War I patrol vessels of the United States
Ships built in Morris Heights, Bronx
1917 ships